Queen was a three-decker sailing ship built in 1773 at Georgia in the United States.

Career
In 1791 her ownership changed to Calvert & Co., a company that had several vessels carrying convicts, trading with the East Indies under contract to the British East India Company (EIC), and in the South Seas Whale Fisheries.

Queen transported convicts in 1791 from England to Australia as part of the third fleet. Under the command of Richard Owen, she sailed from Cork, Ireland, on 10 April 1791 and arrived in Port Jackson, New South Wales on 26 September 1791. She embarked 133 male and 22 female convicts, of whom seven male convicts died during the voyage. Queen transported the first contingent of Irish convicts to Australia. The New South Wales Corps provided the guard.

After delivering her convicts, Queen sailed to Bengal, but her departure date from Port Jackson is currently unknown. In Bengal she picked up a cargo of cotton for the EIC.

Queen finally returned to England on 6 February 1793, having been gone for two years and four months. The Times : The Queen was in a leaky state and her crew were reported to all dead (except eight or nine) and those very ill from scurvy. She did not touch at the Cape of Good Hope nor at St. Helena, to which the violent disorder of the scurvy is attributed. Only six men could come up on deck when she came in. Had the wind been unfavourable, they may have all perished.

On 3 July 1793 Richard Owen received a letter of marque for Queen. By late 1793-early 1794 Queen was sailing between London and Antigua, and armed with ten 9-pounder guns.

The recapture took place on 27 August. In mentioning the two vessels, Warren described Queen as coming from Jamaica, and the brig Mary, from New Orleans to London, as carrying a cargo of furs, indigo, and so forth.

Fate
Queen is listed in Lloyd's Register in 1797 with R. Colley, master. However, Lloyd's List reported that the "Queen (transport), from the West Indies, foundered the 30th December in a Gale.— People saved".

Notes, citations and references
Notes

Citations

References
 Bateson, Charles (1974) The Convict Ships, 1787–1868. (Sydney). 
 Hackman, Rowan (2001) Ships of the East India Company. (Gravesend, Kent: World Ship Society).

External links
Convicts and Convict Ships Sent to Port Jackson NSW 1787-1800

1773 ships
Ships of the Third Fleet
Captured ships
Maritime incidents in 1796